Petrophile trifurcata is a species of flowering plant in the family Proteaceae and is endemic to south-western Western Australia. It is a shrub with three-lobed, needle-shaped, sharply-pointed leaves, and spherical heads of hairy, yellow flowers.

Description
The flowers are arranged at the ends of branchlets in sessile, spherical heads  in diameter, with egg-shaped involucral bracts at the base.

Taxonomy
Petrophile trifurcata was first formally described in 1995 by Donald Bruce Foreman in Flora of Australia from material collected near Wongan Hills in 1983. The specific epithet (trifurcata) means "three-forked", referring to the three-pronged leaves.

Distribution and habitat
This petrophile is only known from a few locations near Wongan Hills and between Watheroo and Coorow in the Avon Wheatbelt, Geraldton Sandplains biogeographic regions, growing in sandy soil with Actinostrobus arenarius.

Conservation status
This petrophile is classified as "Priority Two" by the Western Australian Government Department of Parks and Wildlife meaning that it is poorly known and from only one or a few locations.

References

trifurcata
Eudicots of Western Australia
Endemic flora of Western Australia
Plants described in 1995